Minuscule 732 (in the Gregory-Aland numbering), Θε416 (von Soden), is a Greek minuscule manuscript of the New Testament written on paper. Palaeographically it has been assigned to the 13th century. The manuscript has no complex contents. Scrivener labelled it as 750e.

Description 

The codex contains the text of the four Gospels on 271 paper leaves (size ), with one lacuna (John 21:22-25).

The text is written in one column per page, 49-50 lines per page.

There is also another division according to the smaller Ammonian Sections, but there are no references to the Eusebian Canons.

It has a commentary of Theophylact, and Synaxarion.

Text 

Aland did not place the Greek text of the codex in any Category.

It was not examined by using the Claremont Profile Method.

History 

Scrivener and Gregory dated the manuscript to the 13th or 14th century. The manuscript is currently dated by the INTF to the 13th century.

Minuscule 745 could be rewritten from this manuscript.

The manuscript was added to the list of New Testament manuscripts by Scrivener (750) and Gregory (732). It was examined and described by Paulin Martin. Gregory saw the manuscript in 1885.

The manuscript is now housed at the Bibliothèque nationale de France (Gr. 185) in Paris.

See also 

 List of New Testament minuscules
 Biblical manuscript
 Textual criticism

References

Further reading 

 

Greek New Testament minuscules
13th-century biblical manuscripts
Bibliothèque nationale de France collections